Keyeno Thomas (born 29 December 1977, in Point Fortin) is a Trinidadian former football player who last played for Joe Public.

His previous clubs included San Juan Jabloteh in Trinidad and Tobago and Colorado Rapids in the United States.

Thomas played many matches for the Trinidad and Tobago national football team.

References

External links
 Player profile at SocaWarriors.net
 
 
 Profile on caribbeanstars.com

1977 births
Living people
Trinidad and Tobago footballers
Trinidad and Tobago international footballers
Colorado Rapids players
Joe Public F.C. players
TT Pro League players
2002 CONCACAF Gold Cup players
2007 CONCACAF Gold Cup players
Expatriate soccer players in the United States
Major League Soccer players
Colorado Rapids draft picks
Association football defenders